Ealing Cricket Club Ground, also known as Corfton Road, is a cricket ground in Ealing, West London. The first recorded match on the ground was in 1874, when Ealing Cricket Club played MCC. The ground, which was formerly in Middlesex, was the venue for over 50 Middlesex Second XI fixtures between 1935 and 2011 and was used by Middlesex Cricket Board for one match in 2002.

In 1973, the ground held its first Women's One Day International when Jamaica played Trinidad and Tobago in the 1973 Women's Cricket World Cup. Two further Women's ODIs were held on the ground during the 1993 Women's Cricket World Cup, with India playing New Zealand and England played the Netherlands.

In local domestic cricket, the ground is the main home venue of Ealing Cricket Club who play in the Middlesex County Cricket League.

References

External links
Ealing Cricket Club Ground on Cricinfo

Cricket grounds in London
Sports venues completed in 1879